

In history
Approximately six million Jews were murdered during the Holocaust
 Nakam was a Jewish revenge group that tried to kill six million Germans

In popular culture 
Six Million is a number incorporated into the names of various works over time:

Works about the Holocaust
Did Six Million Really Die?, a 1974 Holocaust denial pamphlet allegedly written by British National Front member Richard Verrall, and published by Nazi propagandist Ernst Zündel. The pamphlet is banned in Germany and South Africa.
Paper Clips Project (Six Million Paper Clips), a U.S. middle school history project started in 1998, forming the basis for:
Das Büroklammer-Projekt (The Paper Clip Project), a 2000 history and documentary book written and published in Germany by Peter W. Schroeder
Paper Clips, a 2004 documentary film by Elliot Berlin and Joe Fab
Six Million Crucifixions, a 2010 history book by Gabriel Wilensky
Six Million and One, a 2011 documentary film by David Fisher

Other works
Symphony of Six Million, a critically acclaimed 1932 U.S. Pre-Code film directed by Gregory La Cava
The Six Million Dollar Man, a 1973–1978 U.S. science fiction television show
Six Million Ways to Die, a 1996 album by Cutty Ranks
Six Million Ways to Live, a 2001/2005 electronica album by Dub Pistols
"The Six Million Dollar Mon", seventh episode of the seventh season of Futurama, first aired in 2012